Marta Estévez García (born 5 June 1997) is a Luxembourgish-Spanish footballer who plays as a midfielder for Wormeldingen-Munsbach-CSG and  the Luxembourg women's national team.

Career
Estévez García has been capped for the Luxembourg national team, appearing for the team during the 2019 FIFA Women's World Cup qualifying cycle.

International goals

Personal life
Estévez has three siblings and attended the European School of Luxembourg (ESL) in the Spanish section. She graduated and obtained her European Baccalaureate in 2015. After turning 16, Estévez obtained her Luxembourgish nationality, thus making her a double national. She speaks fluently Spanish (her mother tongue), as well as English, French, German and Luxembourgish.

References

External links
 
 
 

1997 births
Living people
Women's association football midfielders
Luxembourgian women's footballers
Spanish women's footballers
Luxembourgian people of Spanish descent
Luxembourg women's international footballers